Kiss FM is a Portuguese commercial radio station established by Paul Buick in 1992

Description 
The station is licensed within Portugal to broadcast in the English language and its target audience is the Ex Pat community in the Algarve area of Portugal. Kiss FM is the only English speaking radio station in Portugal. The station broadcasts from studios Albufeira. Kiss FM is the home of the Kiss FM Breakfast Show. The flagship show on the station is currently hosted by Si Frater since 2012 and celebrating 8 years on January 2, 2020. The motto of the Breakfast Show is " Getting you where you`re going with a smile on your face". In February 2019 Spike Hammond took over the lunchtime, Spike's show airs Monday to Friday 12noon-4pm and it is full of the northern humour that follows Spike around...Following Spike is Mark SEBBO Sebastian who is a veteran of radio with over 45 years experience under his belt ... enjoy 12 hours of live DJs every day on Kiss FM delivering you the best you can get on radio ..
Over the weekend Kiss FM has some specialist show for you including GHR ( Ghetto House radio ) from the US with Hozer on a Saturday night from 10 till midnight .. Sundays Kicks off with Owen Gee and the Solid Gold Sunday Show 9 till 1pm and then to finish the live shows on the weekend it is back to Spike Hammond for the Sunset Reggea Show from 7 till 8pm.

Gallery

References 

 

Mass media in Albufeira
Radio stations in the Algarve
Radio stations established in 1992
1992 establishments in Portugal